Henry Slingsby may refer to:

Henry Slingsby (died 1634) (1560–1634), MP
Sir Henry Slingsby, 1st Baronet (1602–1658), English Royalist landowner and Member of Parliament
Henry Slingsby (Master of the Mint) (1621–1690), Master of the Mint 1662–1680
Henry Slingsby (1638–1701), MP for Portsmouth and Lieutenant-Governor of Portsmouth
Sir Henry Slingsby, 3rd Baronet (1660–1691) of the Slingsby baronets, MP for Knaresborough
Sir Henry Slingsby, 5th Baronet (1695–1763) of the Slingsby baronets, MP for Knaresborough

See also
Slingsby (disambiguation)